The 2009 VMI Keydets football team represented the Virginia Military Institute during the 2009 NCAA Division I FCS football season. It was VMI's 119th all-time football season which started in 1891. They competed in the Big South Conference, and they were led by 2nd year head coach Sparky Woods, who was appointed VMI's 30th head coach in 2008. VMI played its home games at Alumni Memorial Field, as they still do ever since 1962.

The Keydets kicked off the year by just defeating Robert Morris 14–13. Two losses followed to then-#6 James Madison and then-#1 Richmond, 44–16 and 38–28, respectively. Three more losses followed to conference opponents , Coastal Carolina, and Stony Brook. The next week, VMI held off Presbyterian for a 31–20 win. VMI finished 2–9 overall and 1–5 in the Big South.

Schedule

Team leaders

Rushing

Passing

Receiving

Punt returning

Interceptions

Kick returning

References

VMI
VMI Keydets football seasons
VMI Keydets football